Ludmil B. Alexandrov is a Bulgarian-American scientist and an assistant professor at the University of California, San Diego.

Education
Alexandrov received his PhD from University of Cambridge in 2014.

Career and research
Alexandrov is known for developing the concept of mutational signatures together with Michael Stratton and colleagues at the Wellcome Sanger Institute. 

Alexandrov's research interests are in computational biology, cancer genomics, mutagenesis, ageing and bioinformatics. Alexandrov is one of the co-leaders of the Mutographs of Cancer project, a £20 million Grand Challenge Project funded by Cancer Research UK "to fill in the missing gaps to identify the unknown cancer-causing factors and reveal how they lead to cancer."

References 

Year of birth missing (living people)
Living people
Alumni of the University of Cambridge
American people of Bulgarian descent
University of California, San Diego faculty